Colombia competed at the 2022 World Athletics Championships in Eugene, United States, from 15 to 24 July 2022. The Colombian Athletics Federation had initially entered 14 athletes, but ended up competing with 7 of them due to the withdrawals of 7 athletes.

Without having won any medal, Colombia ranked 73rd place in the overall placing table with one point, achieved thanks to Éider Arévalo's eighth place in the men's 35 kilometres race walk. It was the first time since Berlin 2009 that Colombia did not win a medal.

Team
Originally, Colombia entered 14 athletes qualified for the World Athletics Championships; however, the Colombian team was eventually reduced to 7 athletes after the withdrawals of the team for men's 4 × 400 metres relay event (conformed by Gustavo Barrios, Raúl Mena, Jhon Perlaza, Jelssin Robledo, Nicolás Salinas and Jhon Solis) and the javelin thrower Flor Ruiz, all of whom were unable to obtain a visa to enter the United States (except for Raúl Mena).

Other notable absences for Colombia (due to injuries) included the sprinter Anthony Zambrano and the racewalker Sandra Arenas, both silver medalists at Tokyo 2020.

Results
Colombia entered 14 athletes.

Men 
 Track and road events

* – Indicates the athlete competed in preliminaries but not the final

Field events

Women 
 Track events

Field events

References

External links
Oregon22｜WCH 22｜World Athletics

Nations at the 2022 World Athletics Championships
2022
2022 in Colombian sport